The 2009 All-Ireland Senior Football Championship was the inter-county Gaelic football tournament played between 31 counties of Ireland, London and New York. The draw for the 2009 championship took place on 9 October 2008. The tournament began on 10 May 2009.

The 2009 All-Ireland Senior Football Championship Final took place on 20 September 2009, contested by Cork and Kerry. This was the year Tadhg Kennelly made history by becoming the first person to ever hold AFL Premiership and All-Ireland winning medals in the sports of Australian rules football and Gaelic football—he previously won the biggest prize in Australian rules with Sydney Swans in 2005.

Structure
Four knockout (single elimination format) provincial championships are played. London and New York compete in Connacht. The 4 provincial champions advance to the All-Ireland quarter-finals.
The 16 teams eliminated before reaching a provincial semi-final compete in Round One of the Qualifiers (New York do not compete in the Qualifiers). The 8 Round One winners advance to Round Two.
Qualifiers, Round Two: The 8 teams eliminated in provincial semi-finals each play one of the 8 Round One winners.
Qualifiers, Round Three: The 8 Round Two winners play off to reduce the number to 4.
Qualifiers, Round Four: The 4 teams eliminated in provincial finals each play one of the 4 Round Three winners.
All-Ireland Quarter-finals: The 4 provincial champions each play one of the 4 Round Four winners.
The winners of the All-Ireland Quarter-finals then advance to the Semi-finals, and the winners of the Semi-finals go on to the 2009 All-Ireland final.

Fixtures and results

Leinster Senior Football Championship

Munster Senior Football Championship

Connacht Senior Football Championship

Ulster Senior Football Championship

All-Ireland qualifiers

Round 1

Round 2

Round 3
A draw was made for round 3 of the qualifiers, with the winners of round 2 playing each other.

Round 4
A draw was made for round 4 of the qualifiers, with the winners of round three (Donegal, Kerry, Meath and Wicklow) playing against the losing provincial finalists (Antrim, Galway, Kildare and Limerick).

All-Ireland series

Quarter-finals

Semi-finals

Final

Championship statistics

Miscellaneous

 Cork and Limerick met in the Munster final for the first time since 1901.
 Antrim reached their first Ulster final since 1970.
 Wicklow reached round 4 of the qualifiers, winning four championship games for the first time in their history.
 Mayo and Meath met for the first time in the championship since the 1996 All-Ireland Senior Football Championship Final.

Top scorers

Season

References

External links
 All-Ireland SFC Results